Enaini Panjari is a 1995 Indian Bodo political film directed by Khanindra Bodosa and starred by Jayanta Narzary, Ashok, Kabita, Maya and Reshma Mushahary in the lead roles. It was released in 1995. The film was produced by Bwirathi Production Limited.

Production
It is the first film presentations of Bwirathi Production Limited from Kokrajhar district.

Soundtrack
Rahen Brahma, Rupen, Brojen and Pendla composed the music for the soundtracks and lyrics were penned by Rahen Brahma and Pupen. The music was popular hit like songs "Bobe Raijwni Rajkhungur Nwng", "Bilingfang Horni Okhafwr Gaodang" and "Hajwni Dwi Srai Srai". The famous singers Bigrai Brahma, Sulekha Basumatary and Reena to voice the actors.

See also
 List of Bodo-language films

References

1995 films
Bodo-language films
Indian political films